The 2004 Australian GT Performance Car Championship was a CAMS sanctioned Australian motor racing title, organised by Procar Australia as part of the PROCAR Championship Series and open to high performance coupes and sedans, racing with minimal modifications.
It was the second running of the Australian GT Performance Car Championship.

During the running of the championship, PROCAR relinquished its Category Management rights back to the Confederation of Australian Motor Sport.

Justin Hemmes won the championship driving a Subaru Impreza WRX, defeating semi-factory Volkswagen Golf R32 driver Paul Stokell by 90 points. Mitsubishi Lancer driver Garry Holt was third.

Calendar
The championship was contested over a seven round series.

Points system
Points were awarded on a 30-24-20-18-17-16-15-14-13-12-11-10-9-8-7-6-5-4-3-2-1 basis to the top 21 classified finishers in each race except for the two rounds run over two races, where the second race was worth double points. An additional 3 points were awarded to the driver setting the fastest qualifying time at each round.

Results

References

External links
 2004 Australian GT Performance Car Champion, Justin Hemmes at the Oran Park round Retrieved from www.asphotos.com.au on 22 September 2009
 2004 Race Results, www.natsoft.biz, as archived at www.webcitation.org

GT Performance Car Championship
Australian Performance Car Championship